SOH or soh may refer to:

Facilities and structures
 Sydney Opera House, Sydney, New South Wales, Australia
 South Horizons station of the Hong Kong MTR, station code SOH

Groups, organizations, companies
 Hispaniolan Ornithological Society of the Dominican Republic and Haiti
 Sound of Hope, international Chinese-language radio network established by practitioners of the Falun Gong new religious movement
 Southern Ohio Aviation (ICAO airline code: SOH), see List of airline codes (S)
 School of Health, University of Guam, Guam
 Southwest Senior High School, San Diego, California, USA

Other uses
 Soh (surname), an alternative spelling of various Chinese, Japanese, and Korean surnames
 Sine = Opposite ÷ Hypotenuse, a mnemonic used to teach trigonometry
 Stable ocean hypothesis of ecology
 Start of Header (or Start of Heading), an ISO C0 control code
 State of health of batteries
 Sense of humour, the tendency of experiences to provoke laughter and provide amusement
 SOH-States of Humanity, a Gesamtkunstwerk created by multi media artist Alex Vermeulen
 Vanguard: Saga of Heroes, an MMORPG videogame

See also

 
 SOHS (disambiguation)